Mongsit or Möngsit, also known as Maingseik was small state of the Shan States in what is today Burma.

History
The capital and residence of the Myoza was Mongsit town, located in the northern part of the state and with 1,223 inhabitants according to the 1901 Census of India. The northern half of Mongsit was irrigated by the Nam Teng and the southern by the Nam Pawn.

Rulers
The rulers of Mongsit bore the title of Myoza.

Myozas
1816 - 18..                ....
18.. - 1857                Sao Haw Pik
1857 - 18..                Hkun Kyaw San
18.. - 1873                Hkun Lu
1873 - 1876                Nang Li (f)
1873 - 1876                Hkam Yi -Regent (1st time)
1876 - 1880                Sao Leng Leong
1880 - 1883                Hkam Yi -Regent (2nd time)
1883 - ....                Hkam Pwin                          (b. 1861 - d. ....)

References

Shan States